Ubalá is a municipality and town of Colombia in the department of Cundinamarca. It is located in the Eastern Ranges of the Colombian Andes. It is the only municipality of Cundinamarca that is split in two parts.

Climate

Etymology 
In the Chibcha language of the Muisca, Ubalá means "Place on the hillside" or "At the foot of the hillside".

History 
The region west to Ubalá was inhabited by the Muisca before the Spanish conquistadores entered the Altiplano Cundiboyacense. To the east of Ubalá the indigenous Tegua were living and to the south the Guayupe.

Ubalá was properly founded on October 23rd, 1846 by Ospina Rodríguez.

Economy 
Main economical activity of Ubalá is mining, predominantly emeralds, iron ore, sandstones, clay and salt.

Gallery

References 

Municipalities of Cundinamarca Department
Populated places established in 1846
Muisca Confederation
Muysccubun